Vadapalani Metro station is a Metro railway station on the Line 2 of the Chennai Metro, which is currently under operation. The station is among the elevated stations along corridor II of the Chennai Metro, Chennai Central–St. Thomas Mount stretch. The station serves the neighbourhoods of Vadapalani and Kodambakkam.

Vadapalani station is one of the major stations on the Koyambedu-Alandur stretch and became operational by early 2015.

Construction history
The station was constructed by Consolidated Constructed Consortium (CCCL). The consolidated cost of the station along with the stations of Koyambedu, Arumbakkam, CMBT, and Ashok Nagar was  1,395.4 million.

The station
The station is an elevated station at the junction of Jawaharlal Nehru Road and Arcot Road. At 16 metres above the street level, the station is the highest elevated station of the Chennai Metro.

According to CMRL, the station was projected to have at least 12,000 people passing through.

Layout

Facilities

Connectivity
In 2014, Chennai Metro Rail Limited (CMRL) announced plans to connect Vadapalani Metro station with Forum Vijaya mall by means of a service road adjacent to the station.

Supportive infrastructure

As of 2013, about 11,000 vehicles pass through the section on Jawaharlal Nehru Salai between Kathipara and Vadapalani and 12,000 vehicles pass through the Vadapalani-Koyambedu section during peak hours. A total of 185,000 vehicles use the road every day.

Along with Koyambedu and Ashok Nagar Metro stations, Vadapalani Metro station will be developed by leasing out space either for shops or office spaces. As part of fire safety measures, underground water tanks of 50,000 to 100,000 litre capacity will be set up at the station.

The station will have an integrated flyover to bypass the junction. The 450-metre-long four-laned flyover will be built at a cost of  694.3 million and the central portion will be integrated with the Vadapalani Metro rail station. A separate bay will be constructed inside the station to enable MTC buses to drop and pick up passengers.

The flyover is being built jointly by the CMRL and the highways department.

See also

References

External links
 

 UrbanRail.Net – descriptions of all metro systems in the world, each with a schematic map showing all stations.

Chennai Metro stations
Railway stations in Chennai